Segelföreningen i Björneborg (BSF for short), is a yacht club from Pori, Finland.

BSF was established on 26 January 1856 and it is the oldest sports club in Finland. The clubhouse is located on Kallo island by the Port of Pori, adjacent to the Kallo Lighthouse, some 20 kilometres northwest of the city.

The club hosted the 2006 Snipe European Championship, and will be hosting the event again in 2018.

References

External links 
Segelföreningen i Björneborg Official Homepage

Yacht clubs in Finland
Sports clubs established in 1856
Sport in Pori
Sport in Satakunta